In astronomy, a transit instrument is a small telescope with extremely precisely graduated mount used for the precise observation of star positions.  They were previously widely used in astronomical observatories and naval observatories to measure star positions in order to compile nautical almanacs for use by mariners for celestial navigation, and observe star transits to set extremely accurate clocks (astronomical regulators) which were used to set marine chronometers carried on ships to determine longitude, and as primary time standards before atomic clocks.  The instruments can be divided into three groups: meridian, zenith, and universal instruments.

Types

Meridian instruments 
For observation of star transits in the exact direction of South or North:
 Meridian circles, Mural quadrants etc.
 Passage instruments (transportable, also for prime vertical transits)

Zenith instruments 
 Zenith telescope
 Photozenith tube (PZT)
 zenith cameras
 Danjon astrolabe, Zeiss Ni2 astrolabe, Circumzenital

Universal instruments 
Allow transit measurements in any direction
 Theodolite (Describing a theodolite as a transit may refer to the ability to turn the telescope a full rotation on the horizontal axis, which provides a convenient way to reverse the direction of view, or to sight the same object with the yoke in opposite directions, which causes some instrumental errors to cancel.)
 Altaz telescopes with graduated eyepieces (also for satellite transits)
 Cinetheodolites

Observation techniques and accuracy 
Depending on the type of instrument, the measurements are carried out
 visually and manual time registration (stopwatch, Auge-Ohr-Methode, chronograph)
 visually by impersonal micrometer (moving thread with automatic registration)
 photographic registration
 CCD or other electro optic sensors.

The accuracy reaches from 0.2" (theodolites, small astrolabes) to 0.01" (modern meridian circles, Danjon). Early instruments (like the mural quadrants of Tycho Brahe) had no telescope and were limited to about 0.01°.

See also 
 Astronomical transit
 Latitude/longitude observation, vertical deflection
 Positional astronomy, astro-geodesy

References

Further reading 
 Karl Ramsayer: Geodätische Astronomie, Vol.2a of Handbuch der Vermessungskunde, 900 p., J.B.Metzler, Stuttgart 1969
 Cauvenet and Brünnow's Handbooks of Spherical Geodesy

External links 
 
 
 Great Transit at Lick Observatory, +Photo
 Modern roboter telescopes
 The Carlsberg Automatic Meridian Circle
 Photo of a 19th-century transit instrument (Jones 1826)
 Transit instruments used by the Survey of India, 1867

Astrometry
Geodesy